A Journey Called Life (Traditional Chinese: 金石良缘) is a TVB modern drama series broadcast in March 2008, starring Linda Chung, Steven Ma and Kent Cheng.

This is also one of the few TVB series that TVB has produced that dealt with real life issues and scenarios. It's a series that involved both morals and life's lessons. The entire series featured problems that teenagers and young adults have been dealing with over past decade, including drugs, abortions, rape, family trust and relationships, money and greed.

Synopsis
Never torn apart in sorrow
Never give up in hope

Ever since her mother died when she was young, Sze Ka-Ka (Linda Chung) became rebellious and lived a life of drugs, alcohol and general lawlessness. Due to her step-family's disdain for her and misunderstandings surrounding her mother's death, Ka and her family do not get along. When a random incident reveals that her mother's remains have gone missing, Ka desperately searches for them. Eventually, she is able to find the remains in Kam Shek's (Kent Cheng) stone factory. Ka's love for her mother impresses Shek and his disciple Shing Yat-On (Steven Ma). On befriends Ka and helps her solve many of her problems, even finding her a job in his sister, Shing Mei-Sum's (Fala Chen) company. Ka appreciates all the things On has done for her and slowly, her lifestyle changes for the better. They grow to adore one another, but do not confess their love for each other because they were both afraid of being heartbroken and would rather keep their brother-sister-like relationship. Eventually an opportunity occurs when Shek is staying in the hospital for heart surgery. Shek has Ka become On's trainer for the marathon in his place. When On wins third place in the race and celebrates with his old running partner, Ka becomes jealous, but it is through this that they reveal their feelings for each another.

Sum is a money-oriented woman who wants to marry rich. She dates her boss Tung Ka-Cheung (Cheng Tse-Sing) while having an affair with Shek's son Kam Wing-Loi (Raymond Cho). When she gets pregnant accidentally, she has an abortion because she does not want the baby to ruin her chances of marrying rich. The family is bitterly disappointed in Sum. As her relationship with her family worsens, Cheung also reveals that he is aware of Sum's affair with Loi and violently breaks up with her. Rejected by her family and now without someone to depend on, Sum is downcast and drinks to relieve her stress. When the family is leaving after eating at a restaurant, Ka is hit by Sum's drunk driving and loses her unborn child. On, especially, is very upset and become incredibly cold towards Sum. In guilt, Sum drinks and becomes an alcoholic and eventually dies from alcohol poisoning at the moment on the beach when On arrived attempting to help her. On becomes depressed and loses his optimism for life. However, with the help of Ka and his vision of their daughter, On again finds hope and is able to finish the marathon that he has prepared so long for. Together, Ka becomes pregnant once again and Kam moves back home.

Cast
Sze family

Shing family

Kam family

Cheung family

Other cast

Viewership ratings

Awards and nominations
41st TVB Anniversary Awards (2008)
 "Best Drama"
 "Best Actress in a Leading Role" (Linda Chung - Sze Ka-Ka)

References

External links 

TVB.com A Journey Called Life - Official Website 
K for TVB.net A Journey Called Life - Episodic Synopsis and Screen Captures

TVB dramas
2008 Hong Kong television series debuts
2008 Hong Kong television series endings